North American Soccer League (NASL) was a professional soccer league with teams in the United States and Canada that operated from 1968 to 1984. Beginning in 1975, the league final was called the Soccer Bowl.

CBS (1967–1976)

National Professional Soccer League (1967)
In 1967, two professional soccer leagues started in the United States: the FIFA-sanctioned United Soccer Association, which consisted of entire European and South American teams brought to the US and given local names, and the unsanctioned National Professional Soccer League. The National Professional Soccer League had a national television contract in the U.S. with the CBS television network (which signed a two-year contract to broadcast a game every Sunday afternoon live and in color). The NPSL kicked off on Sunday, April 16 with a full slate of five matches. However, the ratings for matches were unacceptable even by weekend daytime standards and the arrangement was terminated. Bill MacPhail, head of CBS Sports, attributed NASL's lack of TV appeal to empty stadiums with few fans, and to undistinguished foreign players who were unfamiliar to American soccer fans.

Play-by-play voice Jack Whitaker was joined by the former Northern Ireland international Danny Blanchflower as a pundit. Blanchflower was not impressed with the standard of play and did not hesitate to say so.

The leagues merged in 1968 to form the North American Soccer League (NASL). It has been suggested that the timing of the merge was related to the huge amount of attention given throughout the English-speaking world to the victory by England in the 1966 FIFA World Cup and the resulting documentary film, Goal. While the USSF and FIFA refused to recognize the NPSL, the television contract with CBS guaranteed some element of financial stability.

Controversy
Toronto Croatia played in the National Soccer League until 1975 when they purchased the Toronto Metros of the North American Soccer League to form Toronto Metros-Croatia. During this period the team attracted many soccer stars, such as Portuguese superstar Eusébio, and were successful enough that they won Soccer Bowl '76 – a 3–0 win over the Minnesota Kicks – at the Kingdome in Seattle.  The championship team was coached by Marijan Bilić, an immigrant to Canada who had played for Dinamo Zagreb. The champions' team was: Paolo Cimpiel, Ted Polak, Željko Bilecki, Ivan Lukačević, Robert Iarusci, Eusébio, Mladen Cukon, Carmine Marcantonio, Ivair Ferreira, Wolfgang Suhnholz, Damir Sutevski, Ivan Grnja, Filip Blašković and Chris Horrocks.

However, the NASL was never comfortable with the Croatia link (an obvious ethnic connection).  League executives lobbied CBS to ensure they were only referred to as Toronto at the Soccer Bowl on television.

The Pelé effect
It was during the 1975 season that the New York Cosmos acquired the Brazilian star Pelé, whom they had been attempting to sign since the team was created. Steve Ross had apparently not heard of him before getting involved in soccer, but agreed to finance the transfer when Clive Toye compared the Brazilian's popularity to that of the Pope. Pelé joined the Cosmos on June 10, 1975 on a salary of $1.4 million per year, an enormous wage for an athlete at that time. A number of contracts—only one of which mentioned soccer—were set up for Pelé to ensure that he paid the lowest amount of tax possible, including one as a "recording artist" with Warner subsidiary Atlantic Records. "We owned him lock, stock and barrel," Toye retrospectively boasted.

Pelé's arrival created a media sensation and overnight transformed the fortunes of soccer in the USA. The Pelé deal was later described by Gavin Newsham, an English writer, as "the transfer coup of the century". His arrival turned the Cosmos from a motley crew of foreigners, semi-professionals and students into a huge commercial presence. The club's groundsman, on hearing that the Brazilian's début for New York was to be broadcast on CBS, spray-painted the pitch green to disguise how little grass was on it: the match, against the Dallas Tornado, was broadcast to 22 countries and covered by more than 300 journalists from all over the world. From the moment he signed his contract at the 21 Club on 10 June 1975 in front of ecstatic Steve Ross and a crush of worldwide media, the player's every move was followed, bringing attention and credibility to the sport in America. As previously mentioned, his debut NASL match five days later versus the Dallas Tornado at the dilapidated Downing Stadium on Randall's Island was broadcast live on CBS network—the first regular-season NASL match on US network TV in six years.

It was the Cosmos' tenth match of the season and led by the Brazilian, who recorded an assist and a goal; New York came back from two goals down for the 2–2 final score. The contest was also Pelé's first competitive match in eight months since his last outing with Santos FC in October 1974. He would eventually end up with five goals in his debut season during which his biggest challenge became figuring out how to fit into this team of journeymen players with abilities far inferior to his. Still his biggest impact was on the sport in New York and the rest of America as Cosmos' home attendance got tripled in just half the season he was there. They also played in front of huge crowds on the road since everyone wanted to see Pelé - towards the end of the season when he pulled a hamstring and couldn't suit up, 20,000 fans in Philadelphia showed up just to see him in street clothes. Furthermore, the league's profile got raised as other NASL teams - encouraged by Ross' investment in Pelé and the prominence his arrival brought to the Cosmos franchise - started bringing over more big-name aging foreign stars such as George Best who was about to turn 30, 31-year-old Rodney Marsh, 34-year-old Geoff Hurst, and 35-year-old Bobby Moore.

Commentators
Paul Gardner - Gardner was the color commentator for the first-ever live telecast in the United States of a World Cup final, in 1982 on ABC. He also served as ABC color commentator with Jim McKay for NASL games in 1979-81. He also did commentary for NBC (1986 World Cup), CBS (NASL) and ESPN (college), and has been a film producer and was the scriptwriter and soccer adviser for the award-winning instructional series Pele: The Master and His Method in 1973.
Frank Glieber - In 1963, Glieber began a long career with CBS television. Over the next two decades he would broadcast a variety of events for the network including NFL football, NBA and NCAA basketball, professional bowling, tennis, NASL soccer, and golf (including the Masters Tournament each spring). Glieber continued to broadcast local Dallas area sports events during his time at CBS, working as many as sixteen hours a day.
Mario Machado - He was the voice of soccer for the CBS television network in 1968 and in 1976, covering the North American Soccer League (NASL). He hosted the weekly soccer program, The Best of the World Cup for the Spanish International Network.  Machado hosted Star Soccer from England on Public Broadcasting Service (PBS) Public television stations for six years.
Seamus Malin - He also worked with the NASL's Boston Minutemen and New York Cosmos. He also called World Cup matches for NBC, ABC, and Turner Network Television, plus matches on CBS when the network had NASL rights.
Jon Miller - His first network exposure came in 1976, when he was selected by CBS-TV to broadcast the NASL Championship Game. From 1974–1976, Miller did play-by-play for the Washington Diplomats of the NASL. He also announced the Soccer Game of the Week for nationally syndicated TVS from 1977–1978.

TVS Television Network and Mizlou Television Network (1977–1978)
Soccer Bowl '78 was broadcast live in the United States on the TVS network. Jon Miller handled play-by-play duties, while Paul Gardner was the color analyst. This would be the final NASL game broadcast by the network, as the league signed a deal with ABC Sports in the fall of 1978. Gardner would continue as the color analyst for ABC's coverage, while Miller would move on to a long career announcing Major League Baseball.

Mizlou produced the first "live" coast-to-coast satellite feed, of a New York Cosmos soccer game, from San Jose, California to WOR-TV in New York in the late 1970s.

ABC (1979–1981)
In 1979, ABC Sports began covering the NASL in a deal that called for 9 telecasts of league games, including the playoffs and Soccer Bowl. In 1979, the team from the "Village of Vancouver", the Whitecaps (a reference to ABC TV sportscaster Jim McKay's observation that "Vancouver must be like the deserted village right now", with so many people watching the game on TV) beat the powerhouse New York Cosmos in one of the most thrilling playoff series in NASL history to advance to the Soccer Bowl. In the Soccer Bowl, they triumphed against the Tampa Bay Rowdies in a disappointed New York City.

Decline
On October 1, 1977, Pelé closed out his legendary career in an exhibition match between the Cosmos and Santos. Santos arrived in New York and New Jersey after previously defeating the Seattle Sounders 2–0. The match was played in front of a capacity crowd at Giants Stadium and was televised in the United States on ABC's Wide World of Sports as well as throughout the world. After the retirement of Pelé in 1977, much of the progress that American soccer had made during his stay was lost; there was no star at the same level to replace him as the NASL's headline act. After enduring briefly during the late 1970s, attendances dropped after 1980. The sport's popularity fell and the media lost interest. The deal with broadcaster ABC to broadcast NASL matches was also lost in 1980, and the 1981 Soccer Bowl was only shown on tape delay. All of the franchises quickly became unprofitable, and a salary cap enforced before the 1984 season only delayed the inevitable.

Commentators
Paul Gardner
Verne Lundquist
Jim McKay

ESPN and USA Network (1981–1984)

In the last few years of its existence, the NASL did manage to get some games on a new cable sports network that had begun in 1979 called ESPN. In 1981, they signed a contract to broadcast 20 games on Saturdays. The new USA Network also carried games, usually on Wednesday nights.

Major Indoor Soccer League
The 1982–83 Major Indoor Soccer League season was the fifth in league history and would end with the San Diego Sockers winning their first MISL title. It would be the Sockers' second straight indoor championship, as the club had won the North American Soccer League's indoor league the previous spring.

The league would enter into an agreement with the NASL in the summer of 1982 to begin plans for an eventual merger. Initial plans to have all 14 NASL teams play in the winter would not come to pass, as most teams preferred to concentrate on the outdoor season. However, the Chicago Sting and Golden Bay Earthquakes would join the Sockers for the MISL season.

The MISL continued to make inroads on national television. While the spring would see the end of the league's two-year deal with the USA Network, CBS would broadcast a playoff game live from Cleveland on May 7 that drew an estimated four million viewers.

With the NASL near death in the summer of 1984, a handful of teams made plans to switch from outdoor to indoor soccer once the NASL season ended in October. Along with the Sockers, the Chicago Sting, Minnesota Strikers and New York Cosmos formally made the leap in late August. With the addition of the Dallas Sidekicks, the league went back to a 14-team, two-division setup.

This would be the final year the MISL would have games aired on network television, CBS broadcast Game 4 of the championship series live on May 25.

Commentators (USA Network)
Spencer Ross
Kyle Rote, Jr.
Werner Roth
Al Trautwig

Local stations
WTTW in Chicago carried at least one Sting soccer game (against New York and Pelé, at Giants Stadium) in the early days of that franchise.

WTOG in St. Petersburg, FL aired numerous Tampa Bay Rowdies road games in the late 1970s and early 1980s. Additionally, many of the Rowdies home and away indoor matches were also broadcast.

List of broadcasters

See also
List of Soccer Bowl broadcasters
Major Indoor Soccer League (1978–1992) on television
Women's United Soccer Association on television

References

External links
NASL TV: A Short History
Television And The NASL
Framing Soccer for the Network Era: ABC and the Challenge to Nationally Broadcast the North American Soccer League, 1979-1981
MISL and NASL on National Television
NASL question | Soccer Forum | Big Soccer
The Year in American Soccer - 1981
Classic Ground: San Diego Sockers 1983
BY THE NUMBERS… NORTH AMERICAN SOCCER LEAGUE VS MAJOR LEAGUE SOCCER

ABC Sports
CBS Sports
USA Network Sports
ESPN original programming
TVS Television Network
CTV Sports
CBC Sports
Sports programming on PBS
Mizlou Television Network
Hughes Television Network
Turner Sports
HBO Sports
Television
Association football television series
Soccer on United States television
Soccer on Canadian television
American Broadcasting Company original programming
CBS original programming
USA Network original programming
Wide World of Sports (American TV series)
1968 American television series debuts
1984 American television series endings
1970s American television series